The Warfield, Pratt and Howell Company Warehouse is an historic building located in downtown Des Moines, Iowa, United States. The building was built by wholesale grocer Warfield, Pratt and Howell Company. Wilson R. Warfield and John W. Howell moved their business to Des Moines in 1860 and moved to this location in 1884. William J. Pratt joined the partnership in 1897. The prominent Des Moines architectural firm of Proudfoot & Bird designed the building, and it is considered a good example of warehouse construction from the turn of the 20th century. It was completed in 1901 with an addition completed in 1909. It features load bearing brick piers, bearing walls, and wood column and girder technology on the interior. Other wholesale firms were housed in the building after 1935. It was part of a redeveloped district in the 1980s. The building was listed on the National Register of Historic Places in 1985.

References

Commercial buildings completed in 1909
Buildings and structures in Des Moines, Iowa
National Register of Historic Places in Des Moines, Iowa
Commercial buildings on the National Register of Historic Places in Iowa